Paul Neal "Red" Adair (June 18, 1915 – August 7, 2004) was an American oil well firefighter. He became notable internationally as an innovator in the highly specialized and hazardous profession of extinguishing and capping oil well blowouts, both land-based and offshore.

Early life and education
Adair was born in Houston, Texas, the son of an Irish immigrant blacksmith and his wife. He attended Reagan High School.

Military service and career
During World War II, Adair served in the US Army, in a bomb disposal unit. After the war ended, he started working in the oil industry. He started his career working for Myron Kinley, the "original" blowout/oil firefighting pioneer. They pioneered the technique of using a V-shaped charge of high explosives to snuff the fire by the blast. This was known as the Munroe effect, and Adair saw it used in bazookas and the atom bomb.

In 1959 he founded Red Adair Co. Inc. Over the course of his career, Adair battled more than 2,000 land and offshore oil well, natural gas well, and similar spectacular fires. He gained global attention in 1962 when he tackled a fire at the Gassi Touil gas field in the Algerian Sahara nicknamed the Devil's Cigarette Lighter, a  pillar of flame that burned from 12:00 PM November 13, 1961, to 9:30 AM on April 28, 1962. In December 1968, Adair sealed a large gas leak at an Australian gas and oil platform off Victoria's southeast coast.

In 1977, he and his crew, including Asger "Boots" Hansen and Manohar "Man" Dhumtara-Kejriwal, contributed to capping the biggest oil well blowout to have occurred in the North Sea. At the time this was the largest offshore blowout worldwide, in terms of volume of crude oil spilled. This took place at the Ekofisk Bravo platform, located in the Norwegian sector and operated by Phillips Petroleum Company, now ConocoPhillips.

In 1978, Adair's top lieutenants Hansen and Ed "Coots" Matthews left to found a competitor firm, Boots & Coots International Well Control Inc.

In 1988, Adair helped to put out the UK sector Piper Alpha oil platform fire in the North Sea. At age 75, Adair took part in extinguishing the oil well fires in Kuwait set by retreating Iraqi troops after the Gulf War in 1991.

Adair retired in 1993, and sold The Red Adair Service and Marine Company to Global Industries. His top employees (Brian Krause, Raymond Henry, Rich Hatteberg) left in 1994 and formed their own company, International Well Control (IWC).

Adair died in Houston in 2004 at the age of 89. He is buried in a crypt at Forest Park Lawndale in Houston.

Family

He was survived by his wife, a son and a daughter.

Legacy

The 1968 John Wayne movie Hellfighters was loosely based upon the feats of Adair during the 1962 fire in the Sahara.
Adair received the Golden Plate Award of the American Academy of Achievement in 1980.
The History Channel's Modern Marvels episode on "Oil Well Firefighting" was one of Adair's last interviews prior to his death. The episode aired after Adair's death and was dedicated to his memory.
The Travel Channel's Mysteries at the Museum "Most Explosive" episode (2014) features a segment on Adair's success in 1961 in stopping the burning gas line in the Algerian Sahara Desert; it was called "The Devil's Cigarette Lighter". 
He was a longtime member of Lakewood Yacht Club.

References

1915 births
2004 deaths
American firefighters
People in the petroleum industry
Bomb disposal personnel
United States Army soldiers
United States Army personnel of World War II
People from Houston
Well control companies